The following radio stations broadcast on AM frequency 801 kHz:

Australia
VL4QY Cairns, Queensland
VL5RM at Berri, South Australia

North Korea
Pyongyang Broadcasting Station (평양방송), Kimchaek

Philippines
DXES at General Santos
DYKA at San Jose
DZNC at Cauayan

Spain
Radio Nacional from several transmitters

United States

References

Lists of radio stations by frequency